Dreaming Neon Black is the third studio album released by American heavy metal band Nevermore, and was released through Century Media in 1999. Unlike its predecessor, The Politics of Ecstasy, Dreaming Neon Black contains many slower, emotional songs.

Dreaming Neon Black is a concept album; according to Nevermore's lead singer, Warrel Dane, "it's a very simple story about a man who slowly goes insane after losing a woman that he was very close to. Progressive levels of insanity are expressed in the songs, he goes through phases of denial and self-blame, blaming God, then denouncing God. The ending is a little...tragic, a little depressing. Shakesperian. Everybody dies, it's all happy."

The story is based on a personal experience of Dane's. One of his former girlfriends, Patricia Candace Walsh, ceased contact with him when she joined a religious group and was never heard from again, and he began having nightmares of her crying out to him as she drowned. In actuality, Walsh and her husband Douglas Zyskowski were murdered by serial killer Robert Ben Rhoades in January 1990 while hitchhiking to a religious workshop in Georgia, although Dane was initially unaware of this.

The spoken word samples from the intro "Ophidian" and its 10-second reprise at the end of "Forever" are from the Clive Barker movie Lord of Illusions.

Track listing

Note: The song Forever has a run time of 2:35, followed by six minutes and 35 seconds of silence. This silence is followed a 10-second section from the opening track Ophidian.

Credits
Nevermore
 Warrel Dane – vocals
 Jim Sheppard – bass
 Jeff Loomis – guitars
 Tim Calvert – guitars
 Van Williams – drums
Additional personnel
 Christine Rhoades – additional vocals
Production
 Neil Kernon – production, mixing, mastering
 Justin Leeah – additional engineering
 Bobby Torres – additional engineering
 Raymon Breton – mastering
 Travis Smith – illustrations, design, photography
 Karen Mason-Blair – band photography
 Louis Rusconi – additional photography www.Rusconi.com
 Brad Gilson Jr. - additional photography

References

1999 albums
Nevermore albums
Century Media Records albums
Concept albums
Albums produced by Neil Kernon
Albums with cover art by Travis Smith (artist)